Revolve may refer to:

Music
 Revolve (Danger Danger album), 2009
 Revolve (John Newman album), 2015
 Revolve, a 2000 album by Beautiful Skin
 "Revolve", a 1995 song by the Melvins
 "Revolve", a 2008 song by Hush the Many

Other uses
 Revolve NTNU, a student motorsport organization at the Norwegian University of Science and Technology
 Revolve Theatre Company, Henley-on-Thames, Oxfordshire, UK

See also
 Revolver (disambiguation)